Cameron Scott "Cam" Long (born December 30, 1988) is an American professional basketball player who last played for Maccabi Rishon LeZion of the Israeli Premier League. A combo guard, he played college basketball for the George Mason University before playing professionally in Lithuania, France, Germany, Romania and Israel. He was named the Israeli League Cup MVP in 2018.

Early life and college career
Long attended Freedom High School in Woodbridge, Virginia, where he averaged 18.9 points, six assists, seven rebounds and two steals per game as a senior. Long was named Cardinal District Player of the Year, Northwest Region Co-Player of the Year and was a nominee for McDonald's All-American.

Long played college basketball for George Mason University's Patriots, where he ranked 10th in the conference in scoring with 15.1 points per game, sixth in steals (1.4), 11th in field goal percentage (47.9 percent) and 14th in assists (2.9). He shot 43.2 percent from three-point range, the third highest mark in the league, and scored double figures in 30 of Mason's 34 contests.

Long completed his career with Mason ranked fifth in career assists (354), sixth in steals (147) 14th in career scoring (1,400 points), ninth in field goal percentage (38.3 percent), and 16th in rebounds (512). He appeared in 132 games for the Green and Gold, more than any other player in program history. On March 3, 2011, Long earned a spot in the First-team All-CAA.

Professional career

Šiauliai (2011–2012)
In 2011, Long started his professional career with the Lithuanian team Šiauliai. On February 14, 2012, Long recorded a career-high 31 points, shooting 12-of-19 from the field, along with six rebounds, four assists and two steals in a 99–105 loss to Nevėžis. On March 12, 2012, Long participated in the 2012 LKL Slam Dunk Contest as part of the Lithuanian League All-Star Game event. Long helped Šiauliai reach the 2012 Lithuanian League Playoffs as the third seed, but they eventually were eliminated by Lietuvos rytas in the Semifinals.

Le Mans (2012–2013)
On June 25, 2012, Long signed with the French team Le Mans for the 2012–13 season. On April 6, 2013, Long recorded a season-high 28 points, shooting 9-of-16 from the field, along with five assists in an 82–89 loss to Cholet Basket. Long helped Le Mans reach the 2013 French League Playoffs as the sixth seed, but they eventually were eliminated by ASVEL Basket.

ratiopharm Ulm (2013–2014)
On July 13, 2013, Long joined the German team ratiopharm Ulm, signing a one-year deal with an option for another one. Long helped Ulm reach the 2014 German League Quarterfinals, as well as reaching the 2014 German Cup Finals, where they eventually lost to Alba Berlin. On July 10, 2014, Long parted ways with ratiopharm Ulm due to an injury.

s.Oliver Würzburg (2015–2016)
On July 28, 2015, Long returned to Germany for a second stint, signing a one-year deal with s.Oliver Würzburg after missing the entire 2014–15 season. Long helped Würzburg reach the 2016 German League Playoffs as the eighth seed, where they eventually were eliminated by Brose Bamberg.

Steaua Bucharest (2016–2017)
On June 14, 2016, Long signed with the Romanian team Steaua București for the 2016–17 season.

Maccabi Rishon LeZion (2017)
On March 9, 2017, Long parted ways with Steaua to join the Israeli team Maccabi Rishon LeZion for the rest of the season. On April 9, 2017, Long recorded a season-high 28 points, shooting 5-of-8 from the 3-point range, along with three rebounds, two assists and three steals in a 94–87 win over Maccabi Kiryat Gat. Long helped Rishon LeZion reach the 2017 Israeli League Final Four, where they eventually lost to Hapoel Jerusalem.

Maccabi Ashdod (2017–2018)
On July 23, 2017, Long signed with Maccabi Ashdod for the 2017–18 season. On May 6, 2018, Long logged his first career triple-double in a 92–67 win over Hapoel Gilboa Galil. Long recorded 14 points, 10 rebounds and 10 assists, along with 4 steals. He was subsequently named Israeli League Round 29 MVP. Long helped Ashdod reach the 2018 Israeli League Playoffs as the fourth seed, where they eventually lost to Hapoel Tel Aviv in the Quarterfinals.

Return to Rishon LeZion (2018–2019)
On July 19, 2018, Long returned to Maccabi Rishon LeZion for a second stint, signing a one-year deal. On October 4, 2018, Long recorded 24 points, seven rebounds and four assists, leading Rishon LeZion to win their first ever Israeli League Cup title after a 78–66 win over Hapoel Be'er Sheva. He was subsequently named the League Cup Tournament MVP. On April 14, 2019, Long recorded a season-high 29 points, shooting 7-of-9 from the field, along with three assists and two steals in a 87–76 win over Hapoel Tel Aviv. Long led Rishon LeZion to the 2019 Israeli League Final, where they eventually lost to Maccabi Tel Aviv.

Career statistics

EuroCup

|-
| style="text-align:left;"| 2012-13
| style="text-align:left;" rowspan=1|  Le Mans
| 6 || 2 || 25.7 || .431 || .350 || .444 || 1.5 || 1.3 || 1.0 || .1 || 9.1 || 10.5
|-
| style="text-align:left;"| 2013-14
| style="text-align:left;" rowspan=1|  Ulm
| 16 || 15 || 26.5 || .444 || .377 || .750 || 1.8 || 3.0 || .8 || 0 || 10.6 || 13.5
|-

Domestic Leagues

|-
| style="text-align:center;" | 2011–12
| style="text-align:left;" rowspan=1| Šiauliai
| style="text-align:center;" rowspan=1| LKL
|| 29 || 27.8 || .486 || .409 || .819 || 3.3 || 3.3 || 2.1 || .0 || 13.8
|-
| style="text-align:center;" | 2012–13
| style="text-align:left;" rowspan=1| Le Mans
| style="text-align:center;" rowspan=1| Pro A
|| 33 || 29.3 || .409 || .327 || .759 || 2.0 || 2.3 || 1.1 || .1 || 11.9
|-
| style="text-align:center;" | 2013–14
| style="text-align:left;" rowspan=1| Ulm
| style="text-align:center;" rowspan=2| BBL
|| 34 || 26.1 || .426 || .322 || .772 || 2.3 || 2.4 || .7 || .0 || 11.4
|-
| style="text-align:center;" | 2015–16
| style="text-align:left;" rowspan=1| Würzburg
|| 35 || 25.4 || .446 || .356 || .804 || 2.7 || 3.1 || .8 || .0 || 9.8
|-
| style="text-align:center;" | 2016–17
| style="text-align:left;" rowspan=1| Steaua
| style="text-align:center;" rowspan=1| Divizia A
|| 20 || 31.9 || .429 || .355 || .714 || 4.6 || 5.4 || 1.8 || .1 || 12.3
|-
| style="text-align:center;" | 2017
| style="text-align:left;" rowspan=1| Rishon LeZion
| style="text-align:center;" rowspan=3| IBPL
|| 18 || 29.6 || .461 || .402 || .767 || 4.1 || 3.2 || 2.0 || .0 || 12.1
|-
| style="text-align:center;" | 2017–18
| style="text-align:left;" rowspan=1| Ashdod
|| 36 || 31.5 || .415 || .321 || .711 || 4.5 || 3.7 || 2.0 || .1 || 13.3
|-
| style="text-align:center;" | 2018–19
| style="text-align:left;" rowspan=1| Rishon LeZion
|| 37 || 32.7 || .424 || .364 || .747 || 3.6 || 4.1 || 1.3 || .1 || 15.9
|-
|}
Source: RealGM

References

External links
 George Mason Patriots bio
 RealGM profile

1988 births
Living people
American expatriate basketball people in France
American expatriate basketball people in Germany
American expatriate basketball people in Israel
American expatriate basketball people in Lithuania
American expatriate basketball people in Romania
American men's basketball players
Basketball players from Florida
BC Šiauliai players
George Mason Patriots men's basketball players
Le Mans Sarthe Basket players
Maccabi Ashdod B.C. players
Maccabi Rishon LeZion basketball players
People from Palm Bay, Florida
Point guards
Ratiopharm Ulm players
Shooting guards
s.Oliver Würzburg players